Wei-Chung Wang (born 25 April 1992) is a Taiwanese professional baseball pitcher for the Wei Chuan Dragons of the Chinese Professional Baseball League (CPBL). He has played in Major League Baseball (MLB) for the Milwaukee Brewers, Oakland Athletics, and Pittsburgh Pirates.

Career

Pittsburgh Pirates

Wang signed as an international free agent with the Pittsburgh Pirates in 2011. When the Pirates discovered that Wang required Tommy John surgery, they voided the contract, and signed Wang to a new contract.

Milwaukee Brewers

The Brewers selected Wang from the Pirates in the 2013 Rule 5 draft. Though a player is normally automatically ineligible for the Rule 5 draft in his first four professional seasons, Wang was eligible due to the voided contract. Wang competed for a spot on the Brewers' 2014 Opening Day roster, which he made. Wang made his MLB debut on April 14, 2014 against the St. Louis Cardinals pitching a scoreless inning, allowing one hit.

During the 2015 season, Wang pitched for  the Advanced-A Brevard County Manatees. He was designated for assignment by the Brewers on June 16, 2015. After three years in the minor leagues, the Brewers recalled Wang from Colorado Springs Sky Sox on July 30, 2017. He was granted his release from the Milwaukee Brewers in order to pursue a playing opportunity in South Korea, and was released on January 26, 2018.

NC Dinos
Wang was the first Taiwanese baseball player to play in the South Korean KBO League. He signed a one-year contract for $700,000 with the NC Dinos of the KBO League. The contract was announced by the Dinos on January 26. He became a free agent following the 2018 season.

Oakland Athletics
On February 1, 2019, Wang signed a minor league deal with the Oakland Athletics that included an invitation to spring training. On May 25, his contract was selected and he was called up to the major leagues. Wang became the first Taiwanese player in Athletics' franchise history three days later, when he pitched two scoreless innings against the Los Angeles Angels, allowing only one hit. On July 4, Wang earned his first MLB win, tossing 2.1 shutout innings in a 7–2 victory over the Minnesota Twins, during which he allowed one walk, no hits, and one strikeout. However, Wang struggled to establish himself as a reliable option outside of mop-up duty, and was optioned to Triple-A Las Vegas on August 19, with a 3.33 ERA buoyed almost entirely by a microscopic 0.231 average against on balls put in play. On August 29, Wang was designated for assignment.

Second stint with Pirates
On August 31, 2019, Wang was claimed off waivers by the Pittsburgh Pirates. He earned wins twice as a reliever. His MLB stats during the 2019 season was 3–0, with ERA 3.77 in 25 appearances. Wang was outrighted off the Pirates roster on November 2 and became a free agent.

Wei Chuan Dragons
Wang was selected first overall by the Wei Chuan Dragons in the 2020 Chinese Professional Baseball League draft on July 20, 2020, and returned to his native Taiwan as the first left-handed pitcher to be chosen with the first pick in the CPBL draft. On March 14, 2021, Wang made his CPBL debut as the Dragons' Opening Day pitcher against the Uni-President 7-Eleven Lions.

Personal life
He is the younger brother of former Chicago Cubs minor league player Wang Yao-lin. He is a member of the Amis people.

See also
 List of Major League Baseball players from Taiwan
 Rule 5 draft results

References

External links

1992 births
Living people
Arizona League Brewers players
Brevard County Manatees players
Biloxi Shuckers players
Colorado Springs Sky Sox players
Expatriate baseball players in South Korea
Glendale Desert Dogs players
Gulf Coast Pirates players
KBO League pitchers
Las Vegas Aviators players
Major League Baseball pitchers
Major League Baseball players from Taiwan
Milwaukee Brewers players
NC Dinos players
Oakland Athletics players
People from Taitung County
Pittsburgh Pirates players
Taiwanese expatriate baseball players in the United States
Taiwanese expatriates in South Korea
Wisconsin Timber Rattlers players
2017 World Baseball Classic players
Amis people
Wei Chuan Dragons players
2023 World Baseball Classic players